Anouchka Diane Etiennette (born April 23, 1988) is a Mauritian former swimmer, who specialized in sprint freestyle events. Etiennette started swimming at the age of seven, and made her international debut in 2003, at a local swimming tournament in Mauritius. At age sixteen, Etiennette first competed at the 2004 Summer Olympics in Athens, where she finished fifty-eighth overall in the women's 50 m freestyle with a time of 30.00 seconds. On her second Olympic appearance in Beijing 2008, Etiennette made an impressive result in the women's 50 m freestyle, and finished in the fifth heat within less than thirty seconds. However, she failed to advance into the semi-finals, placing sixty-third in the overall standings for the heats.

Etiennette is a member of The Dolphins of Quatre Bornes, a local swimming club in Mauritius.

References

External links

NBC Olympics Profile

1988 births
Living people
Mauritian female swimmers
Olympic swimmers of Mauritius
Swimmers at the 2004 Summer Olympics
Swimmers at the 2008 Summer Olympics
Mauritian female freestyle swimmers